Chloe Cowen (born 8 June 1973) is a British judoka, who competed at the Olympic Games.

Judo career
Cowen is a five times champion of Great Britain, winning the middleweight division at the British Judo Championships in 1992, 1993 and 1994 and the half-heavyweight division in 1998 and 1999.

She is also a five times European medalist; winning medals at the 1993 European Judo Championships, in Athens, the 1997 European Judo Championships, in Ostend, the 1998 European Judo Championships, in Oviedo, the 1999 European Judo Championships, in Bratislava and the 2000 European Judo Championships, in Wroclaw. In 2000, she was selected to represent Great Britain at the 2000 Summer Olympics, in Sydney; competing in the women's half-heavyweight event she was eliminated by Simona Richter.

Since retirement she became a judo teacher and in 2022 became the National Lead Performance Coach for Irish Judo. she has also been a judo commentator.

References

External links
 

1973 births
Living people
British female judoka
Olympic judoka of Great Britain
Judoka at the 2000 Summer Olympics
Sportspeople from Newcastle upon Tyne